The 1945–46 Scottish Districts season is a record of all the rugby union matches for Scotland's district teams.

History

The Inter-City fixture between Glasgow District and Edinburgh District resumed after the Second World War.

Results

Inter-City

Glasgow District:

Edinburgh District:

Other Scottish matches

None.

English matches

No other District matches played.

International matches

No touring matches this season.

References

1945–46 in Scottish rugby union
Scottish Districts seasons